George Philip Reinagle (1802 – 6 December 1835) was an English marine painter, youngest son of Ramsay Richard Reinagle.

He was a pupil of his father, but he gained much facility in the treatment of marine subjects by copying the works of the Dutch painters Ludolf Backhuysen and Willem van de Velde. He exhibited first at the Royal Academy in 1822, when he sent a portrait of a gentleman; but in 1824 he contributed a 'Ship in a Storm firing a Signal of Distress', and a 'Calm', and in 1825 'A Dutch Fleet at the Seventeenth Century coming to Anchor in a Breeze', and other naval subjects in the following years.

In 1827 he was present on board the Mosquito at the battle of Navarino and on his return he drew on stone, and published in 1828, 'Illustrations of the Battle of Navarin,' which was followed by 'Illustrations of the Occurrences at the Entrance of the Bay of Patras between the English Squadron and Turkish Fleets 1827. He also painted incidents of these engagements, which were exhibited in 1829, 1830 and 1831. He was present with the English fleet on the coast of Portugal in 1833 and his picture of 'Admiral Napier's Glorious Triumph over the Miguelite Squadron' was one of his contributions to the Royal Academy in 1834. Four naval subjects in 1835 were his last exhibited works. He worked both in oil and in watercolours, and gave much promise as a painter of shipping and marine pieces. His works appeared also at the British Institution, and occasionally at the Society of British Artists.

Reinagle died at 11 Great Randolph Street, Camden Town, London, on 6 December 1835, aged 33.

Notes

References

External links

1802 births
1835 deaths
19th-century English painters
English male painters
Landscape artists
British marine artists
19th-century English male artists